Minuscule 801 (in the Gregory-Aland numbering), δ553 (von Soden), is a Greek minuscule manuscript of the New Testament written on paper. Palaeographically it has been assigned to the 15th century. The manuscript has complex contents.

Description 
The codex contains the text of the four Gospels, Acts of the Apostles and Pauline epistles, on 324 paper leaves (size ). Folios 324-327 were supplied by a later hand.
The text is written in one column per page, 26-29 lines per page.

Subscriptions were added by a later hand.

The order of books is unusual: Book of Acts, Catholic epistles, Pauline epistles, and Gospels. A similar order appears in 393, 592.

Text 
The Greek text of the codex is a representative of the Byzantine text-type. Hermann von Soden classified it to the textual family Kx. Aland placed it in Category V.

According to the Claremont Profile Method it has mixed Byzantine text in Luke 1 and represent the textual family Kx in Luke 10 and Luke 20. It belongs to the textual subgroup 35.

The Pericope Adulterae (John 7:53-8:11) is marked by an obelus.

History 
According to Gregory the manuscript was written in the 15th century. The manuscript is currently dated by the INTF to the 15th century.

It was added to the list of New Testament manuscripts by Gregory (801e, 264a, 313p). Gregory saw the manuscript in 1886.

The manuscript is now housed at the National Library of Greece (130) in Athens.

See also 

 List of New Testament minuscules
 Biblical manuscript
 Textual criticism
 Minuscule 800

References

Further reading 

 

Greek New Testament minuscules
15th-century biblical manuscripts
Manuscripts of the National Library of Greece